Acalan (Chontal Maya: Tamactun, Nahuatl: Acallan) was a Chontal Maya region in what is now southern Campeche, Mexico. Its capital was Itzamkanac. The people of Acalan were called Mactun in the Chontal Maya language.

Cuauhtemoc, ruler of Tenochtitlan, capital of the Aztec Empire, was executed by Hernán Cortés while they were stopped in Acalan capital of Itzamkanac (actual El Tigre on the right bank of Rio Candelaria) in 1525.

References

Maya civilization
Geography of Mesoamerica